Frederick Plum (June 25, 1887 – November 16, 1932) was an American sports shooter. He competed in the trap event at the 1920 Summer Olympics.

References

External links
 

1887 births
1932 deaths
American male sport shooters
Olympic shooters of the United States
Shooters at the 1920 Summer Olympics
People from Bellefontaine, Ohio
Sportspeople from Ohio